The Singapore Examinations and Assessment Board (SEAB) is a statutory board under the Ministry of Education of the Government of Singapore.

SEAB was established on 1 April 2004 as a statutory board to develop and conduct national examinations in Singapore and to provide other examination and assessment services. The board also publishes examination results for the major exams such as the Primary School Leaving Examination, GCE ‘N’ Level GCE 'O' Level and GCE 'A' Level.

Regulated examinations 
The following national examinations are regulated by the Singapore Examinations and Assessment Board.

Primary school examinations
 Primary School Leaving Examination (PSLE)
 International Primary School Leaving Examination (iPSLE), international variation of the PSLE.

Secondary school examinations
 Singapore-Cambridge GCE Ordinary Level (GCE O-Level)
 Singapore-Cambridge GCE Normal Level (GCE N-Level)
 Singapore-Cambridge GCE Normal (Academic) Level (GCE N(A)-Level)
 Singapore-Cambridge GCE Normal (Technical) Level (GCE N(T)-Level)

Examinations for tertiary education
 Singapore-Cambridge GCE Advanced Level (GCE A-Level)

Organisation Structure 
SEAB is governed by a board which is led by a Chairman. The Chief Executive is the professional head of the organisation. Under the Chief Executive are various divisions organised into 2 clusters: Assessment and Exam Cluster and Corporate Cluster. Divisions in each cluster are led by Directors/Deputy Directors.

External links
SEAB Website

References

2004 establishments in Singapore
Government agencies established in 2004
Education in Singapore
Organisations of the Singapore Government
Statutory boards of the Singapore Government
Educational institutions established in 2004
Qualifications awarding bodies
Regulation in Singapore